Abeid Amani Karume International Airport is the main airport in the Zanzibar Archipelago located on Unguja Island, Zanzibar, Tanzania. It was previously known as Kisauni Airport and Zanzibar International Airport. It was renamed in 2010 in honour of Abeid Amani Karume, the island's first president.

Terminals

Terminal 1
Terminal 1 is an inactive terminal that was used during the British protectorate of Zanzibar. This is a small building found on the northern side of terminal 2 and currently used as the airport office.

Terminal 2
Terminal 2 is active for all landing aircraft. A new shelter on the entrance of the airport has been put in place.

Terminal 3
Construction of the third terminal started in January 2011 by the Chinese Beijing Construction Engineering Group. A new apron of  will replace the existing . The project is estimated to cost about US$70.4 million. On completion, it will have the capacity to serve up to 1.5 million passengers per year. The new terminal was expected to be operational in 2014, but construction work delayed due to financial and technical reasons. The new terminal was inaugurated in September 2020 and started operation in early 2021. Terminal 3 serves international flights while terminal 2 serves both domestic and some international flights.

Airlines and destinations

Passenger

The following passenger airlines operate at Abeid Amani Karume International Airport.

Cargo

Statistics
 Number of flights handled (2005): 14,302
 Passenger traffic (2005): 418,814
 Cargo handled (2005): 566 tons

See also
List of airports in Tanzania
Transport in Tanzania

References

External links

Zanzibar International Airport

Airports in Zanzibar
Airports in Tanzania